Otnjukovia is a genus of butterflies in the family Lycaenidae.
It is monotypic containing only Otnjukovia tatjana (Zhdanko, 1984) from
Kazakhstan (Zhetyzhol Mountains, Almaty ).

References
Zhdanko, A. B., 1984. A review of the genus Turanana Bethune-Baker, with descriptions of Turanana tatjana sp. n. and Otaria subgenus, from Kazakhstan. Trudy Zool. inst. Leningrad 122: 98–105.
Ugelvig, L.V., Vila, R., Pierce, N.E. & Nash, D.R., 2011. A phylogenetic revision of the Glaucopsyche section (Lepidoptera: Lycaenidae), with special focus on the Phengaris–Maculinea clade. Molecular Phylogenetics and Evolution 61(1): 237–243. 

Polyommatini
Lycaenidae genera